Mont Abourasséin is a mountain in Central Africa. It is 1113 metres tall and stands on the international boundary between the Central African Republic and South Sudan. It is in the Haute-Kotto prefecture of the Central African Republic and the Western Bahr el Ghazal state of South Sudan.

References
 Collins maps listing

Abourassein
Abourassein
Abourassein
Central African Republic–South Sudan border
Haute-Kotto
Western Bahr el Ghazal